Talking About Trees is a 2019 documentary film directed by Sudanese film director Suhaib Gasmelbari. It follows the efforts of the Sudanese Film Group, represented by retired filmmakers Ibrahim Shadad, Manar Al Hilo, Suleiman Mohamed Ibrahim and Altayeb Mahdi, to reopen an outdoor movie theater in the city of Omdurman in the face of decades of Islamist censorship and inefficient bureaucracy.  According to film critic Jay Weissberg, the title of the film "comes from Bertolt Brecht’s 1940 poem To Those Born Later, in which he laments the suppression of discussion under dictatorship, and how shifting the discourse to mundane topics painfully draws attention to what can’t be spoken aloud."

Critical reception 
On Rotten Tomatoes, the film has an approval rating of  based on reviews from  critics. A review in the British newspaper The Guardian characterized the film as follows: "First-time director Suhaib Gasmelbari takes a meditative, gently observational approach here. He chooses not to directly interview the four film-makers; instead, what unfolds is a rather lovely poetic portrait of male friendship, cinephilic obsession and elegant dignity."

Following its premiere at the Berlin International Film Festival, Talking about Trees received numerous awards at film festivals worldwide. In 2019, the film also was awarded the Variety MENA Talent Award at the El Gouna Film Festival in Egypt, where film critic Jay Weissberg said:

References to films by Sudanese filmmakers 
In this documentary, Ibrahim Shadad talks about his short graduation film 'Jagdpartie' (Hunting party), that he made in 1964 at the Deutsche Hochschule für Filmkunst Potsdam-Babelsberg in East Germany. This symbolic story about racism was shot in a forest in Brandenburg, and employs the genre of Western movies for the hunting of an African man. Also, Shadad talks about his 14-minute documentary Jamal (Camel) that he produced in Sudan in 1981, featuring the work of a camel in a sesame mill.

Awards
 Original Documentary Award and Audience Award, 69th Berlin International Film Festival , Germany, 2019
 Grand Jury Prize, Mumbai Film Festival , India, 2019
 Variety MENA Award and Golden Star, Best Feature Documentary, El Gouna Film Festival , Egypt, 2019
 Jury Prize, Hamptons International Film Festival , USA, 2019
 International Film Critics Award FIPRESCI and Jury Prize, Istanbul Film Festival, Turkey, 2019.
 Tanit d'Or for Best Documentary, JCC Carthage Film Festival, Tunis, 2019
 Grand Jury Prize, Mumbai International Film Festival, India, 2019
 Best Feature Documentary, Palm Springs Film Festival, USA, 2020
 Audience Award, Lama Film Festival, France, 2019
 Best Debut Film, Miradasdoc, Spain, 2019
 Documentaire sur Grand Ecran Award, Amiens Film Festival, France, 2019
 Best feature documentary, Critics Award, Arab Cinema Center, 2020
 Best feature Documentary, Malmo Arab Film Festival, Sweden, 2020
 Audience Award for best film, Malmo Arab Film Festival, Sweden, 2020
 ACERCA award of the Spanish cooperation,  Tarifa-Tangiers African Film Festival, 2020.
Audience Award for best feature film, Tarifa-Tangiers African Film Festival, Spain, 2020
Golden Kapok Award (Best First Feature Documentary Award), Guangzhou International Documentary Film Festival, China, 2020. 
 Jury Special mentions: Athena Film Festival, Free Zone Human Rights FF, Gabès Film Festival

See also 
 Cinema of Sudan

References

External links
 
 Trailer for Talking about Trees
 Sudan’s forgotten films - Documentary by Souhaib Gasmelbari and Katharina von Schroeder

2019 films
Sudanese documentary films
Films set in Sudan